Pseudohygrophorus is a genus of fungi in the family Tricholomataceae. The genus is monotypic, and contains the single species Pseudohygrophorus vesicarius. The species was first described scientifically by the Czech botanist Josef Velenovský in 1939.

See also

 List of Tricholomataceae genera

References

External links
 

Fungi of Europe
Tricholomataceae
Monotypic Agaricales genera
Taxa described in 1939